Franziska Kinz (21 February 1897, Kufstein, Austria-Hungary (now Austria) – 26 April 1980, Meran, Italy) was an Austrian film actress.

Filmography

Bibliography
 Kester, Bernadette. Film Front Weimar: Representations of the First World War in German films of the Weimar Period (1919-1933). Amsterdam University Press, 2003.

External links

1897 births
1980 deaths
Austrian film actresses
People from Kufstein
20th-century Austrian actresses
Disease-related deaths in Trentino-Alto Adige/Südtirol